Daniil Davydov (born ) is a Russian male futsal player, playing as a forward. He is part of the Russia national futsal team. He competed at the UEFA Futsal Euro 2016.

References

1989 births
Living people
Russian men's futsal players
Futsal forwards
Place of birth missing (living people)